Nephtheidae is a family of soft corals in the phylum Cnidaria. Members of this family are known as carnation corals, tree corals or colt soft corals. They are very attractive and show a wide range of rich and pastel colours including reds, pinks, yellows and purples. They are popular with reef aquarium hobbyists.

Most of these corals are arborescent and have little knobs on the end of their rubbery branches. The coral polyps tend to retract in the daytime which gives these corals their alternative name of broccoli corals because of their resemblance to the vegetable. At night the polyps emerge and extend their tentacles to feed, looking like little bunches of flowers on the ends of the branches.

Genera
The World Register of Marine Species includes the following genera in this family:
Capnella Gray, 1869
Chondronephthya Utinomi, 1960
Chromonephthea van Ofwegen, 2005
Coronephthya Utinomi, 1966
Dendronephthya Kuekenthal, 1905
Drifa Danielssen, 1886
Duva Koren & Danielssen, 1883
Eunephthya Verrill, 1869
Gersemia Marenzeller, 1877
Lemnalia Gray, 1868
Litophyton Forskål, 1775
Neospongodes Kükenthal, 1903
Pacifiphyton Williams, 1997
Paralemnalia Kükenthal, 1913
Pseudodrifa Utinomi, 1961
Scleronephthya Studer, 1887
Stereonephthya Kükenthal, 1905
Umbellulifera Thomson & Dean, 1931

References

 
Taxa named by John Edward Gray
Alcyoniina
Cnidarian families